Sturisomatichthys is a genus of armored catfishes native to Central and South America.

Species
There are currently 12 recognized species in this genus:
 Sturisomatichthys aureum 
 Sturisomatichthys citurensis (Meek & Hildebrand, 1913)
Sturisomatichthys dariense 
Sturisomatichthys festivum 
Sturisomatichthys frenatum 
Sturisomatichthys guaitipan 
Sturisomatichthys kneri 
 Sturisomatichthys leightoni (Regan, 1912)
Sturisomatichthys panamense 
Sturisomatichthys reinae 
 Sturisomatichthys tamanae (Regan, 1912)
Sturisomatichthys varii

Distribution and habitat
The genus Sturisomatichthys is distributed in the northwestern part of South America, on the Pacific and Atlantic slopes of the Andes. The species appear to occupy the same ecological niche as those in Sturisoma.

Description
Sexual dimorphism and reproductive biology of Sturisomatichthys similar to Sturisoma. Sturisomatichthys is distinguished from Sturisoma primarily by the absence of a rostrum. Only one species, S. citurensis, from Panama, seems to be significantly different from all congeneric species in having an abdominal plate cover consisting of small platelets without any particular organization. Other species may represent a species complex with a short snout as in the genus Farlowella with reference to the representatives of the F. curtirostra group. The weakness of this diagnostic feature could lead to the synonymy of Sturisomatichthys with Sturisoma.

References

Harttiini
Fish of South America
Fish of Central America
Catfish genera
Taxa named by Isaäc J. H. Isbrücker
Taxa named by Han Nijssen
Freshwater fish genera